An idol refers to a type of celebrity working in the field of K-pop in fandom culture in South Korea, either as a member of a group or as a solo act. K-pop idols are characterized by the highly manufactured star system that they are produced by and debuted under, as well as their tendency to represent a hybridized convergence of visuals, music, fashion, and dance.  They usually work for a mainstream entertainment agency and have undergone extensive training in dance, vocals, and foreign language. Idols maintain a carefully curated public image and social media presence, and dedicate significant time and resources to building relationships with fans through concerts and meetups.

Trainee system

Inspired by the heyday of MTV in the United States, Lee Soo-man set his sights on laying the foundation for the modern Korean pop music industry. He witnessed New Kids on the Block became very popular in Korea in the 1990s.The K-pop trainee system was popularized by Lee Soo-man, the founder of SM Entertainment. Hundreds of candidates each day attend the global auditions held by Korean entertainment agencies to perform for the chance of becoming a trainee. This was part of a concept labeled cultural technology.

The trainee process lasts for an indefinite period of time, ranging from months to years, and usually involves vocal, dance, and language classes taken while living together with other trainees, who sometimes attend school at the same time. However, some trainees drop out of school to focus on their careers.

Once a trainee enters the system, they are regulated in multiple aspects, including personal life, physical condition, and visual appearance. The survival, training, and regulation take precedence over natural talent in the production of Korean idols. The system requires trainees to maintain a "wholesome image" while remaining "private about their lives and thoughts".

Former trainees have reported that they were required to go through plastic surgeries, such as a Blepharoplasty or a Rhinoplasty, in order to adhere to the acceptable Korean beauty standards. Further criticism towards the trainee system arose regarding the companies' harsh weight restrictions, which often caused trainees to pass out from exhaustion or dehydration in an attempt to reach the required weight for their desired program. 

The investment on a potential trainee could be expensive. In 2012, The Wall Street Journal reported that the cost of training one member of Girls' Generation under SM Entertainment was US$3 million.

Personal image 
When trainees are finally chosen to debut in new groups, they will face a new sett of personalities created by the company to cater to the entertainment market. Each member of an idol group has his or her own character to play, and therefore an important part of their job duties is to maintain that temperament in any kind of exposure they may get. One way to build the personal image of idol groups is through social media services with content managed by the company to ensure the consistency of these personal characteristics.

Relationship with fans
The relationship between Korean idols and their fans can be characterized as "parasocial kin," which means for fans to create a familial connection with their idols rather than just being a "look-from-afar" fan. In some cases, within and outside of fandoms, fans also create familial connections with other fans through similar interests or just to make friends. These interactions can be initiated by the fans, the company, or the idols themselves, where they would most likely still have to go through their company to be approved. Some projects or activities created by fans for the idols must also be approved by the venue or the idols’ company to minimize any harm to the idols and fan participants. Interactions and fan connections can be seen through events like fan meetings, also known as artist engagements, concerts or fan-sites, and artist cafés. An annual event known as KCon is also a place for fans and artists to interact. The nature of this "parasocial kin" relationship can also be seen in the proactive participation of Korean idol fans in the production of idol groups. Even before debut, some trainees would already have their own fans. This leads to the "kinship" starting out early, and building that up is very important for the idol as an artist and the fan as a supporter. Once debuted, fans grow alongside their idols and idol-fan relationships become deeper. If anything happens, fans have their own unique ways to show their attitude and opinion on issues concerning "unfair" actions of management companies. Under this situation, fans often appear to be protecting idols from company mistreatment due to the familial connection built between both sides.

Working conditions 

Several Korean idol groups and solo artists have resented the contracts issued to them by their management companies, claiming that the decade-long contracts are "too long, too restrictive, and gave them almost none of the profits from their success." A director of South Korean entertainment agency DSP Media stated that the company does share profit with the performers, but often little is left over after paying costs. Korean entertainment companies such as S.M Entertainment have been called "factories" for their unique method of mass-producing stars. Members of groups are frequently retired and replaced with fresh trainees when their age or musical inclinations begin to pose a problem. TVXQ charged S.M. Entertainment for unreasonable terms in their contracts with the company in 2009.

Commercialism 
Entertainment companies in Korea use a boot-camp system in grooming their idols. In the case of S.M. Entertainment, the company receives 300,000 applicants in nine countries every year. They possess training facilities in the Gangnam district of Seoul, where recruits then train for years in anticipation of their debut. SM was called the first company to market "bands as brands" and commodify not just the artists' product, but the artists themselves. Such techniques have resulted in mass recognition abroad and helped to spark the Korean Wave, which benefits entertainment companies by broadening their audience. As domestic fandom is not generally enough to produce the profits that these corporations and their players require, branding and marketing of the artist/group has become central to industry profits and ,thus, a defining feature of the genre today.

Reported earnings 
According to the South Korean National Tax Service, the average annual earnings for a Korean idol in 2013 were KR₩46.74 million (US$42,000). This was almost double the 2010 figure of KR₩26.97 million (US$25,275), a rise attributable to the global spread of Hallyu in recent years.

Recognition 
The Korean Wave has led to a global rise in interest in Korean idols, along with other aspects of Korean culture including Korean films and K-dramas being exported to other parts of the globe. Along with the Korean Wave, Korean beauty has become popular due to the wave and has been rising in popularity worldwide. Korean Idols have influenced the rise in popularity due to their seemingly perfect skin. 

Nonetheless, some fanatical behaviors of K-pop idol fans have led to negative stereotypes of K-pop idols in public, as well as caused criticism in society.

Sexualization 
There have been criticisms of the sexual objectification of female and male idols across the industry. The problem is exacerbated due to the higher rigidity of gender norms in contemporary Korean society. Korean censorship practices regarding nudity and obscenity may have further reinforced this objectification.

Korean idols also frequently wear revealing clothes and dance provocatively in music videos as part of the companies' effort to market idols in multiple ways. In some cases, these efforts have resulted in censorship; for example, "Miniskirt" by AOA was deemed sexually inappropriate to public TV shows and programs and was unable to be aired until the group modified their outfits and choreography.

This sexualization has also led to a notion of conformity in idol acceptance. Idols that do not perform in a sexually appealing way to their targeted demographic have been harassed; for example, Amber Liu has received criticism for her androgynous appearance and disregard for gender norms.

See also

 List of South Korean idol groups
 List of South Korean boy bands
 List of South Korean girl groups
 Fandom culture in South Korea
 Japanese idol
 Korean idols in advertising

References

Idol
01
Teen idols